Dangerous & Offensive Trades as classified under the Municipalities of India by an Act passed by the Legislature of India requires licensing and this also serve as a source of income for the local bodies in the Country.  The trades practiced by the traders are called as "D & O Traders".

Indian legislation